Hariq or Hariqi (1856-1909) (Kurdish:Herîq or Herîqî) is the pen name of Mala Saleh the classic Kurdish poet.

Life
He was born in Ziwyie(a village near Suleimanieh). He studied the Fiqh and Islamic Sciences in his home town, Penjwen and Mukriyan. Then became one of the disciples of Naqshbandi tariqa. He passed out and buried in Mahabad.

Hariq's poetry
Hariqi has written lyric and mystic poems in Kurdish and Persian. The bulk of his poems are in the form of ghazal. He is most influenced by Nalî, Mawlawi Tawagozi, among Kurdish poets.

References
E.J. Brill, Qasida Poetry in Islamic Asia and Africa: Classical Traditions and Modern Meanings, 
Sajjadi Ala'edin, The history of Kurdish literature, Baghdad, 1951

Kurdish literature